James Owens VC (1827 – 20 August 1901) was born in Killaine, Bailieborough, County Cavan and was an Irish recipient of the Victoria Cross, the highest and most prestigious award for gallantry in the face of the enemy that can be awarded to British and Commonwealth forces.

Details
He was about 27 years old, and a corporal in the 49th Regiment of Foot (later The Royal Berkshire Regiment (Princess Charlotte of Wales's)), British Army during the Crimean War when the following deed took place for which he was awarded the VC.

On 30 October 1854 at Sebastopol, in the Crimean Peninsula, Corporal Owens greatly distinguished himself in a personal encounter with the Russians, and gave assistance to a lieutenant of his regiment.

He later achieved the rank of Sergeant. He died Romford, Essex, 20 August 1901.

His Victoria Cross is displayed at The Rifles (Berkshire and Wiltshire) Museum(Salisbury, Wiltshire, England).

References

Listed in order of publication year 
The Register of the Victoria Cross (1981, 1988 and 1997)

Ireland's VCs  (Dept of Economic Development, 1995)
Monuments to Courage (David Harvey, 1999)
Irish Winners of the Victoria Cross (Richard Doherty & David Truesdale, 2000)
 Dictionary of Ulster Biography

External links
Location of grave and VC medal (Essex)

Crimean War recipients of the Victoria Cross
Irish recipients of the Victoria Cross
British Army personnel of the Crimean War
Royal Berkshire Regiment soldiers
People from County Cavan
1829 births
1901 deaths
19th-century Irish people
Irish soldiers in the British Army
British Army recipients of the Victoria Cross
Military personnel from County Cavan
Burials in Essex